Coddle Creek Associate Reformed Presbyterian Church, Session House and Cemetery is a historic Associate Reformed Presbyterian church located near Mooresville in Iredell County, North Carolina, United States.

The first church building was constructed in 1753 and destroyed by fire in 1839. Its replacement was destroyed by fire in 1884 and the current structure was built. The church building is a one-story, three bay by five bay, Late Italianate style frame building.  It features an entrance tower with louvered vents, four cross gables with wooden finials at peak, and bracketed eaves.  Also on the property is the contributing session house, built about 1884, and the church cemetery with about 250 gravestones.

It was added to the National Register of Historic Places in 1980.

References

External links
Coddle Creek Associate Reformed Presbyterian Church

Associate Reformed Presbyterian Church
Cemeteries in North Carolina
Churches in Iredell County, North Carolina
Churches on the National Register of Historic Places in North Carolina
Italianate architecture in North Carolina
National Register of Historic Places in Iredell County, North Carolina
Presbyterian churches in North Carolina
Italianate church buildings in the United States